The 1972 French Open was a tennis tournament that took place on the outdoor clay courts at the Stade Roland Garros in Paris, France. The tournament ran from 22 May until 4 June. It was the 76th staging of the French Open, and the second Grand Slam tennis event of 1972. Andrés Gimeno and Billie Jean King won the singles titles.

Finals

Men's singles

 Andrés Gimeno defeated  Patrick Proisy, 4–6, 6–3, 6–1, 6–1
• It was Gimeno's 1st and only career Grand Slam singles title.

Women's singles

 Billie Jean King defeated  Evonne Goolagong, 6–3, 6–3 
• It was King's seventh career Grand Slam singles title, her third in the Open Era and her first and only title at the French Open.

Men's doubles

 Bob Hewitt /  Frew McMillan defeated  Patricio Cornejo /  Jaime Fillol, 6–3, 8–6, 3–6, 6–1
• It was Hewitt's 6th career Grand Slam doubles title, his 1st in the Open Era and his 1st and only title at the French Open.
• It was McMillan's 3rd career Grand Slam doubles title, his 1st in the Open Era and his 1st and only title at the French Open.

Women's doubles

 Billie Jean King /  Betty Stöve defeated  Winnie Shaw /  Nell Truman, 6–1, 6–2
• It was King's 10th career Grand Slam doubles title, her 4th in the Open Era and her 1st and only title at the French Open.
• It was Stöve's 1st career Grand Slam doubles title and her 1st title at the French Open.

Mixed doubles

 Evonne Goolagong /  Kim Warwick defeated  Françoise Dürr /  Jean-Claude Barclay, 6–2, 6–4

References

External links
 French Open official website
 ATP – tournament profile

 
1972 Grand Prix (tennis)
1972 in French tennis
1972 in Paris